Lists of companies traded on the London Stock Exchange by index:

 Constituents of the FTSE 100 Index
 Constituents of the FTSE 250 Index

See also
 FTSE 350 Index: the FTSE 350 index includes the constituent members of the FTSE 100 and FTSE 250, with the various constituents weighted according to market capitalisation
 FTSE All-Share Index
Alternative Investment Market

External links 
 Companies on London Stock Exchange

Companies traded at FTSE
 
London